Team Astromega was a racing team from Belgium, headquartered in Heist-op-den-Berg and created in 1995 by Mikke Van Hool. The team competed in A1 Grand Prix and Formula Renault 1.6 Belgium.

History
Team Astromega was created in 1995 by Belgian International Formula 3000 driver Mikke Van Hool, who wanted to drive in his own team. Since 1996, Sam Boyle has been the team manager.

In 2003, Werner Gillis, an expert in financial management, became co-team owner. The same year, Robby Arnott joined the team as chief engineer after working with DAMS racing team.

In 2003, a Belgian Formula Renault 1.6 championship was created and Astromega was selected to organise the technical assistance for the series rookie test with assistance of two drivers from normal and Indoor Karting. Later, in the 2006 championship, Astromega ran a car with British driver Craig Dolby who became champion. In 2007, Briton Jack Piper and Latvian Karlīne Štāla (who became the first ever woman to win a single seaters championship), were the team drivers.

Astromega has been involved in A1 Grand Prix since the inaugural season in 2005–06, managing A1 Team China and later A1 Team Portugal.

Complete series results

 † These drivers also drove for other teams during the season and their final positions include all team results.
 D.C. = Drivers' Championship position, T.C. = Teams' Championship position.

Timeline

References

External links
 

Belgian auto racing teams
Auto racing teams established in 1995
1995 establishments in Belgium
Formula Renault teams
International Formula 3000 teams
A1 Grand Prix racing teams
Superleague Formula teams
Auto GP teams
Team Astromega